Tetrarhanis simplex, the simple on-off, is a butterfly in the family Lycaenidae. It is found in Nigeria (east and the Cross River loop), Cameroon and the Republic of the Congo. The habitat consists of primary forests.

References

Butterflies described in 1895
Poritiinae
Butterflies of Africa